Andrew Dalgleish may refer to:

 Andrew Dalgleish (diplomat) (born 1975)
 Andrew Dalgleish (spy) (1853–1888)